Thari (Loom) was a 2019 Tamil-language family drama starring Sree Nithi, Angana Roy, Mu Ramaswamy and M. Farina Azad. The show replaces Ilayathalapathy and airs on Colors Tamil from 1 April 2019 to 16 November 2019.

Synopsis
The story is about a girl, Annalakshmi (Sree Nithi), who belongs to the weaving community and how she overcomes problems around her.

Cast

Main cast
 Srineethi Menon as Annalakshmi a.k.a. Annam − Kathiresan's younger daughter
 Angana Roy → Shaliy Avinesh as Nakshatra − Dhruv's elder sister
 Sabari Prasanth as Dhruv − Nakshatra's younger brother

Recurring Cast
 Mu Ramaswamy as Kathiresan − Annalakshmi's father
 M. Farina Azad → Shilpa Martin as Vaani − Annalakshmi's 3rd elder sister
 Jintha Ravi Shankar as Naayagam − Annalakshmi's uncle
 Mithun as Vettukili
 Suresh Chakravarthy as Kalaivaanan − Nakshatra's father
 Harsha Nair

References 

Colors Tamil original programming
2010s Tamil-language television series
2019 Tamil-language television series debuts
Tamil-language television shows